Stanton Lewis (born 9 March 1974) is a Bermudian retired international footballer.

Club career
A left-sided defender, Lewis has played club football for PHC Zebras and Boulevard Blazers.

International career
He earned a total of 21 caps for Bermuda, scoring 1 goal.

His final international match was a November 2006 CONCACAF Gold Cup qualification match against Barbados.

International goals
Scores and results list Bermuda's goal tally first.

Managerial career
In 2012, he was Head Coach of Warwick Academy.

References

1974 births
Living people
Association football defenders
Bermudian footballers
Bermuda international footballers
PHC Zebras players